Ezabad or Ezzabad or Ezz Abad may refer to:
 Ezzabad, Arsanjan, Fars Province
 Ezzabad, Marvdasht, Fars Province
 Ezzabad, Sepidan, Fars Province
 Ezabad, Yazd